Ramsden Bellhouse is a village and civil parish in Essex in the east of England. It is in the Borough of Basildon and in the parliamentary constituency of Billericay.

The River Crouch flows through Ramsden Bellhouse, flowing under Church Road.

During the Middle Ages, Roger fitzReinfrid, a royal justice, held land at Ramsden Bellhouse, and later granted the church to Lesnes Abbey in north Kent.

Its full Domesday Book entry from 1086 reads (in modern translation):

See also
Ramsden Heath

References

External links
 Basildon Heritage
 Basildon Borough History - Ramsden

Villages in Essex
Borough of Basildon